Kalatak (also romanized as Kalātak) is a village in Sorkh Qaleh Rural District, in the Central District of Qaleh Ganj County, Kerman Province, Iran. At the 2006 census, its population was 32, in 5 families.

References 

Populated places in Qaleh Ganj County